Peptidyl-prolyl cis-trans isomerase NIMA-interacting 1 is an enzyme that in humans is encoded by the PIN1 gene.

Pin 1, or peptidyl-prolyl cis/trans isomerase (PPIase), isomerizes only phospho-Serine/Threonine-Proline motifs.  The enzyme binds to a subset of proteins and thus plays a role as a post phosphorylation control in regulating protein function. Studies have shown that the deregulation of Pin1 may play a pivotal role in various diseases.  Notably, the up-regulation of Pin1 is implicated in certain cancers, and the down-regulation of Pin1 is implicated in Alzheimer's disease. Inhibitors of Pin1 may have therapeutic implications for cancer and immune disorders.

Discovery 

The gene encoding Pin1 was identified in 1996 as a result of a genetic/biochemical screen for proteins involved in mitotic regulation.  It was found to be essential for cell division in some organisms. By 1999, however, it was apparent that Pin1 knockout mice had a surprisingly mild phenotype, indicating that the enzyme was not required for cell division per se. Further studies later found that loss of Pin1 in mice displays are not only neuronal degenerative phenotypes but also several abnormalities, similar to those of cyclin D1-null mice, suggesting the conformation changes mediated by Pin1 may be crucial for cell normal function.

Activation 

Phosphorylation of Ser/Thr-Pro motifs in substrates is required for recognition by Pin1. Pin is a small protein at 18 kDa and does not have a nuclear localization or export signal. However, 2009, Lufei et al. reported that Pin1 has putative novel nuclear localization signal (NLS) and Pin1 interacts with importin α5 (KPNA1). Substrate interactions and a WW domain determine subcellular distribution.  Expression is induced by growth signals from E2F transcription factors.  Expression levels fluctuate in normal, but not in cancerous cells.  Expression is often associated with cell proliferation.  Postranslational modifications such as phosphorylation on Ser16 inhibit the ability of Pin1 to bind substrate, and this inhibitory process may be altered during oncogenesis.  It is hypothesized, but not proven, that Pin1 might also be regulated by proteolytic pathways.

Function 

Pin1 activity regulates the outcome of proline-directed kinase (e.g. MAPK, CDK or GSK3) signalling and consequently regulates cell proliferation (in part through control of cyclin D1 levels and stability) and cell survival. The precise effects of Pin1 depend upon the system: Pin1 accelerates dephosphorylation of Cdc25 and Tau, but protects phosphorylated cyclin D from ubiquitination and proteolysis. Recent data also implicate Pin1 as playing an important role in immune responses, at least in part by increasing the stability of cytokine mRNAs by influencing the protein complexes to which they bind. Pin1 has been hypothesized to act as a molecular timer.

Inhibition
PIN1 has been widely investigated as an interesting molecular target for the inhibition of cancer cell lines, such as breast, cervical, ovarian, and endometrial cancers. Studies have demonstrated that  all-trans retinoic acid (ATRA), a natural compound derivative from Vitamin A is involved with PIN1 inhibition. Furthermore, ATRA has also been reported to synergistically enhanced the ability of sorafenib to reduce Pin1 and inhibit cancer growth. Some elemonic acid derivatives have also been reported with inhibitory activity against PIN1. Some computational evidence has also demonstrated that some triterpenoids from neem could also inhibit PIN1 in a similar manner to elemonic acid derivatives

Interactions 

PIN1 has been shown to interact with:

 C-jun, 
 CDC25C, 
 CDC27, 
 CSNK2A2, 
 Casein kinase 2, alpha 1, 
 DAB2, 
 eNOS,
 FOXO4, 
 MPHOSPH1, 
 MYT1, 
 Mothers against decapentaplegic homolog 2,
 Mothers against decapentaplegic homolog 3 
 P53, 
 PKMYT1, 
 PLK1,
 SUPT5H,  
 Telomeric repeat-binding factor 1, and
 Wee1-like protein kinase.

References

Further reading

External links 
 

Enzymes
Isomerases